Vincent Lopez (December 30, 1895 – September 20, 1975) was an American bandleader, actor, and pianist.

Early life and career
Vincent Lopez was born of Portuguese immigrant parents in Brooklyn, New York City, United States, and was leading his own dance band in New York City by 1916. On November 27, 1921, his band began broadcasting on the new medium of entertainment radio; the band's weekly 90-minute show on the Newark, New Jersey, station WJZ boosted the popularity of both himself and of radio. He became one of America's most popular bandleaders, and would retain that status through the 1940s.

He began his radio programs by announcing "Hello everybody, Lopez speaking!" His theme song was "Nola", Felix Arndt's novelty ragtime piece of 1915, and Lopez became so identified with it that he occasionally satirized it. (His 1939 movie short for Vitaphone, Vincent Lopez and his Orchestra, features the entire band singing "Down with Nola".)

Lopez worked occasionally in feature films, notably The Big Broadcast (1932) and as a live-action feature in the Max Fleischer cartoon I Don't Want to Make History (1936). In 1940, he was one of the first bandleaders to work in Soundies movie musicals. He made additional Soundies in 1944.

Noted musicians who played in his band included Artie Shaw, Xavier Cugat, Jimmy Dorsey, Tommy Dorsey, Bob Effros, Mike Mosiello, Fred Lowery, Joe Tarto and Glenn Miller. He also featured singers Keller Sisters and Lynch, Betty Hutton, and Marion Hutton. Lopez's longtime drummer was the irreverent Mike Riley, who popularized the novelty hit "The Music Goes Round and Round".

Lopez's flamboyant style of piano playing influenced such later musicians as Eddy Duchin and Liberace.

In 1941, Lopez's Orchestra began a residency at the Taft Hotel in Manhattan that would last 25 years.

In the early 1950s, Lopez along with Gloria Parker hosted a radio program broadcast from the Taft Hotel called Shake the Maracas in which audience members competed for small prizes by playing maracas with the orchestra.

In 1960 he published his autobiography Lopez Speaking. Vincent Lopez died at the Villa Maria nursing home in North Miami, Florida, on September 20, 1975.

Business interests 
Lopez saw jazz and bandleading as a big business opportunity. Like rival Paul Whiteman had done a few years earlier with his United Orchestras, Inc, in 1924 he created the company Vincent Lopez, Inc, with a stated goal of starting jazz orchestras and schools in major American cities, and managing copyrights. By 1926 the endeavor became insolvent, and to avoid bankruptcy Lopez, Inc went into partnership with Eugene Geiger's Eldorado Finance Co.

In 1927, he partnered with other major bandleaders Paul Whiteman, Ben Bernie, George Olson, Roger Kahn, Fred Rich, B. A. Rolfe, and Ernie Golden to launch the trade union National Association of Orchestra Leaders. They hired Julian T. Abeles at an annual salary of $25,000; his stated goal was to stop competition among their orchestras for musicians, contracts, and bookings. In practice this was a labor cartel, and the NAOL's efforts and lawsuits on behalf of orchestra leaders and owners continued into the 21st century.

Big band / swing-era music
 Early In The Morning, recorded by Vincent Lopez on Columbia Records, lyrics and music by Gloria Parker
 Here Comes That Mood, recorded by Vincent Lopez, music and lyrics by Gloria Parker
 In Santiago by the Sea, recorded by Vincent Lopez and his Orchestra, music and lyrics by Gloria Parker
 I Learned To Rumba''', recorded by Vincent Lopez and his Orchestra, music and lyrics by Gloria Parker
 My Dream Christmas, recorded by Vincent Lopez, lyrics and music by Gloria Parker
 Shake The Maracas, name of a radio program on WABC hosted by Vincent Lopez and Gloria Parker, lyrics and music by Gloria Parker
 When Our Country Was Born, recorded by Vincent Lopez, lyrics and music by Gloria Parker

See alsoThe Vincent Lopez Show (1949-1957 TV show)Dinner Date'' (1950 TV show broadcast from the Hotel Taft)

References

External links

 Vincent Lopez recordings at the Discography of American Historical Recordings.

1895 births
1975 deaths
American jazz bandleaders
Big band bandleaders
Musicians from Brooklyn
American people of Portuguese descent
Vaudeville performers
20th-century American conductors (music)
20th-century American pianists
Jazz musicians from New York (state)
American male pianists
20th-century American male musicians
American male jazz musicians